Kamar Zard (also known as Kamar Zard-e Shāhān and Qamrzard) is a village in Sefid Sang Rural District, Qalandarabad District, Fariman County, Razavi Khorasan Province, Iran. At the 2006 census, its population was 38, in 10 families.

References 

Populated places in Fariman County